Zephyrinus is  a Latin masculine name (derived from the Greek , the name of the west wind).   The name has related forms in modern languages:
 Zéphyrin or Zéphirin (French); feminine: Zéphyrine
 Zephyrin or Zephirin (German); feminine Zephryine
 Zeferino (Italian); feminine: Zeferina
 Ceferino, Zeferino or Seferino (Spanish); feminine: Ceferina, Zeferina or Seferina

The name can refer to the following:

People

Men
 Pope Zephyrinus (died 217), pope and saint
 Zepherinus Joseph (born 1975), Saint Lucia athlete
 Zéphyrin or Zepherin Ferrez (1797–1851), French-Brazilian sculptor and engraver
 Zéphirin Diabré (born 1959), Burkina Faso politician
 Zéphirin Gerbe (1810–1890), French naturalist
 Zephyrin Engelhardt (1851–1934), German Franciscan and historian
 Zéphyrin Camélinat(1840–1932), French communist and political activist
 Zéphyrin Toé (1928–2013), Burkina Faso bishop
 Louis-Zéphirin Joncas (1846–1903), Canadian journalist and politician
 Louis-Zéphirin Moreau (1824–1901), German bishop

Women
 Marie Zéphyrine of France (1750–1755), French princess
 Princess Amalie Zephyrine of Salm-Kyrburg (1760–1841), German princess

See also
 Ceferino, a given name
 Rosa 'Zephirine Drouhin', a rose
 Zeferino, a given name
 Zephyrina Jupon, a type of skirt